Filipodium is a genus of parasites in the phylum Apicomplexa. Species in this genus infect marine invertebrates.

This genus was described by Hukui in 1939.

Taxonomy

The type species is Filipodium ozakai.

Description

The mucron is broadly funnel-shaped with papillae around its rim. The gamonts are elongate, with longitudinal striations and with many protrusible filaments emerging from beneath the pellicle. The gametocysts have numerous oocysts. The gametes are dissimilar: the male gametes are not flagellated. The oocysts are ellipsoidal or ovoid and have 8 sporozoites.

Life cycle

The species infects sipunculid worms.

The parasite infects the gastrointestinal tract and is presumably transmitted by the orofaecal route but the details of this mechanism are presently unknown.

Host record

F. ozakii — Siphonosoma kumanense

References

Apicomplexa genera